Sikhism is a minority religion in Russia, with an estimated population of under one thousand adherents. There is one gurdwara in Russia, located in Moscow.

History 
Guru Nanak is traditionally locally known as Nanak Kadamdar in Russia. Sikh students were invited to study in the Soviet Union through cultural exchange programs starting in the 1950s, during which time they were granted temporary resident status. Sikhs that supported Communism were permitted to immigrate to the Soviet Union. Most Sikh immigrants to the Soviet Union worked in radio and publishing, often in the distribution of Indian-language media. Cultural exchange programs declined following the dissolution of the Soviet Union in 1991, but immigration numbers began to trend upward again by the late 1990s. However, Sikhs make up less than 2% of Indian students in Russia as of 2020.

Prior to the construction of a gurdwara, Sikhs in Moscow would meet to worship at a rented canteen hall. The Moscow Gurdwara Committee was registered in 1996, and the Gurdwara Nanak Darbar was established as a place of worship for Sikhs in 2005 by the Afghan Sikh community. Immigration from Afghanistan increased the population of Sikhs during the 2010s.

Sikh community 
As of 2020, the number of Sikhs in Russia is estimated to be between 300 and 1,000, and a significant portion of this population is made up of Afghan refugees. Sikhs in Moscow commonly work as traders, selling products from India. The Gurdwara Nanak Darbar is the religious center for Sikhs in Moscow, though it is legally recognized as a "cultural center" as the government has never authorized the establishment of an official gurdwara. Approximately 100 Sikhs attend Sunday prayers here each week, though this number doubles during Gurpurb celebrations.

See also 

 Religion in Russia

References

Bibliography 

 

Sikhism in Russia
Demographics of Russia